John Ashley Turnbull (30 June 1935 – 13 February 2018) was a New Zealand cricketer. He played first-class cricket for Auckland and Northern Districts between 1955 and 1963.

See also
 List of Auckland representative cricketers

References

External links
 

1935 births
2018 deaths
New Zealand cricketers
Auckland cricketers
Northern Districts cricketers
Cricketers from Gisborne, New Zealand